Brad Ingelsby (born January 4, 1980) is an American screenwriter and film producer.

Ingelsby is the son of basketball player and coach Tom Ingelsby and Rose Ingelsby. His brother Martin Ingelsby is also a basketball coach. Ingelsby grew up in Berwyn, Pennsylvania and attended Archbishop John Carroll High School where he was coached by his uncle, Fran Inglesby. He graduated from Villanova University with a business degree. After graduating, he taught at St. Patrick's School in Malvern.

Ingelsby attended the American Film Institute as a graduate student in screenwriting. He took a job at Cedar Point Amusement Park after his first year and came up with a story about a character that was released from jail. He wrote "The Low Dweller" based on this story, and after graduating sent the screenplay to Focus Features executive Mike Pruss. After returning to Pennsylvania, Ingelsby was informed that Leonardo DiCaprio wished to star in the film and Ridley Scott wanted to direct it. "The Low Dweller" was rewritten and came out as Out of the Furnace in 2013, starring Christian Bale and Woody Harrelson.

In 2015, he wrote Run All Night, starring Liam Neeson and Ed Harris. He wrote the character study American Woman, starring Sienna Miller, in 2018. In 2020, Ingelsby's The Way Back was released. It featured Ben Affleck and follows a basketball coach trying to improve a high school team as well as his personal life. The Way Back was based on a spec script by Ingelsby entitled "The Has-Been." Ingelsby wrote and produced the HBO TV series Mare of Easttown. The success of the show led to a 3-year overall deal with HBO.

Filmography 
 The Honeyfields (2006) (short)
 The Dynamiter (2011)
 Out of the Furnace (2013)
 Run All Night (2015)
 American Woman (2018)
 Our Friend (2019)
 The Way Back (2020)
 Mare of Easttown (2021) (TV)

References

External links 
 

1980 births
Living people
21st-century American male writers
21st-century American screenwriters
American male screenwriters
American male television writers
American television writers
Archbishop John Carroll High School alumni
Film producers from Pennsylvania
People from Chester County, Pennsylvania
Screenwriters from Pennsylvania
Villanova University alumni
Writers Guild of America Award winners